Inchbuie (Scottish Gaelic: Innis Bhuidhe, 'yellow island') is an island of the River Dochart, near Killin. A bridge links it with both riverbanks, just below the Falls of Dochart.

The MacNab Clan were once dominant here, and have long been associated with Killin.  Their ancient burial ground is visible from the bridge.  The walled enclosure features two 18th century naive 'busts' on top of the walls, and the monuments within include a late medieval effigy of a warrior in the West Highland style (one of only two known examples outside Argyll and the Hebrides).

External links
 Killin.info  community website, guides, photos, media, news.
 YouTube.com video of Falls of Dochart area in spate, featuring Inchbuie.
 YouTube.com video of Killin area featuring Inchbuie.
 

River islands of Scotland
Islands of Stirling (council area)